Ashur Yousif (Syriac: ܐܫܘܪ ܝܘܣܦ ܐܦܢܕܝ, Ašur Yousep Afendi) born Abraham Yusef; (1858 Harput, Ottoman Empire - June 23, 1915 Diyarbekir, Ottoman Empire) was a professor and an ethnic Assyrian intellectual prior to World War I and the Assyrian genocide. He was Protestant, as was his wife Arshaluys Oghkasian, daughter of an Armenian Protestant minister. He studied (but did not graduate) at the Central Turkey College in Antep, and later became professor of Classical Armenian language at the Euphrates College in  Harput. In 1909, Ashur started publishing a Turkish-language newspaper named Murshid Athuriyion ("the spiritual guide of the Assyrians"). He also composed poems in Armenian and Turkish.

Ashur and his brother Donabed along with other Assyrian leaders from the town of Harput were arrested on April 19, 1915 and were all later hanged. His children and grandchildren have written numerous books on him. On June 24, 2006, Ashur Yusef's great-grandson gave an emotional speech at the "Assyrian Society of UK" regarding the Assyrian genocide and praised UK politicians Councillor Mike Elliot and Stephen Pound MP for their efforts on the issue.

Quotes
The hindrance before the advancement of the Assyrian people was not so much the attacks from without as it was from within, the doctrinal and sectarian disputes and struggles, like Monophysitism (One nature of Christ) Dyophysitism (Two natures of Christ) is a good example, these caused division, spiritually, and nationally, among the people who quarreled among themselves even to the point of shedding blood. To this very day the Assyrians are still known by various names, such as Nestorians, Jacobites, Chaldeans 

A letter sent by Ashur Yusef to his brother Hanna Yusef in the U.S., during his jail term before his execution:
Monday April 20, 1915

From my cell to my beloved brother, Hanna Yousouf in America.

Yesterday on Sunday morning April 19th 1915 when we had heard that the Turks were crazed with the anger of beastly slaughter, sparing neither man woman or child we became terrified. Especially when the news came of the arrests of my comrades, I began to shiver, and during the course of preparing a hiding place, I myself was arrested and brought to this cell.

This is a good opportunity that I am enjoying to write you my last letter, for I know we will be cut to pieces when we leave here, though I do not know when and where.

Do not worry over my death-it is God's will- I am going to heaven to protect the rights of the Assyrians at the presence of the biggest and greatest Judge. The books and the work I had started about our nation's education remains unfinished. I am afraid they will be destroyed in a very short time. One of my biggest desires has been to keep our brother Donabed away from drink. I'd have given anything under the sun to have made him temperate but it was in vain. I will give him my last advice after I finish writing to you.

I leave my loving wife and children in your care. My son Isaak was to graduate from high school this year. I had intended to give him a college education, which is another unfinished task I leave in your hands.

The time is almost up and I close this sad missive with wishes for your welfare and safety, so that God may some day lead you to revenge on your enemies!

Farewell brother, farewell"
Ashur S. Yousouf"

References

Assyrian nationalists
Yusef, Ashur
Assyrian writers
1915 deaths
1858 births
19th-century Protestants
People who died in the Assyrian genocide